Live in Gdańsk is a live album by David Gilmour. It is a part of his On an Island project which includes an album, tour, DVD, and live album. It was released on 22 September 2008. A David Gilmour Signature Series Fender Stratocaster was released at the same time.

Recording
It is a recording of the final show of his On an Island Tour in 2006, where he played to an audience of 50,000 at the Gdańsk Shipyard to celebrate the founding of the Solidarity trade union. The show featured the song "A Great Day for Freedom", from the Pink Floyd album The Division Bell (1994) and was the only show of the tour to feature it. It was last performed by Gilmour during his semi-acoustic shows in 2002.

Gilmour played the entire On an Island album during this concert.

It's the final Pink Floyd-related recording to feature Richard Wright, who died on 15 September 2008, one week before the album's official release. Also notably, this concert took place approximately one month following the death of Syd Barrett.  Gilmour and his band were backed by the Polish Baltic Philharmonic Orchestra conducted by Zbigniew Preisner. Leszek Możdżer was featured on piano as a special guest.

Editions 
The six different available editions of Live in Gdańsk are:

 Two-disc edition containing the concert on CD
 Three-disc edition containing the above plus a DVD featuring 114 minutes of concert footage, plus a 36-minute documentary
 Four-disc edition containing the above plus a 5.1-surround sound mix of On an Island and 11 extra audio-visual tracks taken from various TV appearances
 Five-disc deluxe edition containing the above plus an extra CD containing 12 bonus live tracks from the 2006 tour as well as a wallet of memorabilia.
 Five-LP vinyl edition containing the whole Gdansk show, including "Wot's... Uh the Deal?" and a bonus LP containing 2 Barn Jams, "On the Turning Away" and two songs from Live at Abbey Road.
 iTunes edition containing the entire album, plus various region-dependent audio and video extras.

The DVD that comes with the three-, four-, and five-disc sets allowed the purchaser to download 12 additional tracks free of charge via a web-pass. (As of May 2010, this content is no longer accessible.) These tracks included all 12 tracks on the bonus CD included with the five-disc version, and the song "Wot's...Uh the Deal?" that was performed at the concert but not included on the album itself. The bonus tracks were released one per month as follows:
 September 2008: "Wot's...Uh the Deal?" (Gdańsk)
 October 2008: "Shine On You Crazy Diamond" (Venice and Vienne)
 November 2008: "Dominoes" (Paris)
 December 2008: "The Blue" (Vienne)
 January 2009: "Take a Breath" (Munich)
 February 2009: "Wish You Were Here" (Glasgow)
 March 2009: "Coming Back to Life" (Florence)
 April 2009: "Find the Cost of Freedom" (Manchester)
 May 2009: "This Heaven" (Vienne)
 June 2009: "Wearing the Inside Out" (Milan)
 July 2009: "A Pocketful of Stones" (Vienne)
 August 2009: "Where We Start" (Vienne)
 September 2009: "On the Turning Away" (Venice)

Track listing 
Below are the official track listings for the different editions of the album.

Standard edition 
The standard two-CD edition is the most basic form of the album and is simply the recording of the Gdańsk show, omitting "Wot's... Uh the Deal?":

Disc 1
 "Speak to Me" – 1:23
 "Breathe" – 2:49
 "Time" – 5:38
 "Breathe (Reprise)" – 1:32
 "Castellorizon"  –3:47
 "On an Island" – 7:26
 "The Blue" – 6:39
 "Red Sky at Night" – 3:03
 "This Heaven" – 4:33
 "Then I Close My Eyes" – 7:42
 "Smile" – 4:26
 "Take a Breath" – 6:47
 "A Pocketful of Stones" – 5:41
 "Where We Start" – 8:01

Disc 2
 "Shine On You Crazy Diamond" – 12:07
 "Astronomy Domine" – 5:02
 "Fat Old Sun" – 6:40
 "High Hopes" – 9:57
 "Echoes" – 25:26
 "Wish You Were Here" – 5:15
 "A Great Day for Freedom" – 5:56
 "Comfortably Numb" – 9:22

Three-disc edition 
This version contains the two CDs above and the following DVD:

DVD (Disc 3)
 120-minute film of the Gdańsk concert.
 "Castellorizon"
 "On an Island"
 "The Blue"
 "Red Sky at Night"
 "This Heaven"
 "Then I Close My Eyes"
 "Smile"
 "Take a Breath"
 "A Pocketful of Stones"
 "Where We Start"
 "Astronomy Domine"
 "High Hopes"
 "Echoes"
 "A Great Day for Freedom"
 "Comfortably Numb"
 "Wot's... Uh the Deal?" (end credits)

 Gdańsk Diary – a 36-minute documentary.
 Web-pass to download 12 additional live tracks recorded during the European tour and "Wot's...Uh the Deal?" (which was omitted from the album due to lack of space).

Songs performed at the show but omitted from the DVD:
 "Shine On You Crazy Diamond"
 "Speak to Me"/"Breathe"
 "Time"/"Breathe (Reprise)"
 "Wot's... Uh the Deal?"
 "Fat Old Sun"
 "Wish You Were Here"

Four-disc edition 
This version contains the three discs above and the following DVD:

DVD (Disc 4)
 The Mermaid Theatre, London, March 2006
 "Shine on You Crazy Diamond" – 10:57
 "Wearing the Inside Out" – 8:09
 "Comfortably Numb" – 7:20

 The AOL Sessions, New York, April 2006
 "On an Island" – 6:48
 "High Hopes" – 9:10

 Live from Abbey Road, London, August 2006
 "The Blue" – 6:27
 "Take a Breath" – 6:20
 "Echoes (Acoustic)" – 6:51

 Barn Jams, Sussex, England, January 2007
 "Barn Jam 166" – 4:49
 "Barn Jam 192" – 2:49
 "Barn Jam 121" – 7:32

 A 5.1 surround sound mix of On an Island – 51:42 (audio only)
"Castellorizon"
"On an Island"
"The Blue"
"Take a Breath"
"Red Sky at Night"
"This Heaven"
"Then I Close My Eyes"
"Smile"
"A Pocketful of Stones"
"Where We Start"

Deluxe edition 
This version contains the four discs above and the following CD containing the 12 live tracks that are available via the web-pass on Disc 3.

The deluxe edition is no longer in production.

Disc 5 (Bonus tracks from the "On an Island" tour, 2006)

 "Shine On You Crazy Diamond" – 13:09Venice, 12 August 2006 & Vienne, 31 July 2006
 "Dominoes" – 4:53Paris, 15 March 2006
 "The Blue" – 6:21Vienne, 31 July 2006
 "Take a Breath" – 6:43Munich, 29 July 2006
 "Wish You Were Here" – 5:17Glasgow, 27 May 2006
 "Coming Back to Life" – 7:10Florence, 2 August 2006
 "Find the Cost of Freedom" – 1:27Manchester, 26 May 2006
 "This Heaven" – 4:27Vienne, 31 July 2006
 "Wearing the Inside Out" – 7:32Milan, 25 March 2006
 "A Pocketful of Stones" – 6:27Vienne, 31 July 2006
 "Where We Start" – 7:37)Vienne, 31 July 2006
 "On the Turning Away" – 6:06Venice, 12 August 2006

The Deluxe Edition also contains a 20-page booklet (the other versions have a 12-page booklet) and these items of memorabilia:
 Reproduction postcard
 Ticket
 Backstage pass and artist's pass
 A large double-sided poster
 A guitar plectrum (a replica of the plectrums used by Gilmour on the tour)
 Seven photographs

Vinyl edition 
The vinyl edition of the album is no longer in production.

LP 1:
 "Speak to Me"
 "Breathe"
 "Time"
 "Breathe (Reprise)"
 "Castellorizon"
 "On an Island"
 "The Blue"
 "Red Sky at Night"
 "This Heaven"

LP 2:
 "Then I Close My Eyes"
 "Smile"
 "Take a Breath"
 "A Pocketful of Stones"
 "Where We Start"

LP 3:
 "Shine On You Crazy Diamond"
 "Wot's... Uh the Deal?"
 "Astronomy Domine"
 "Fat Old Sun"
 "High Hopes"

LP 4:
 "Echoes"
 "Wish You Were Here"
 "A Great Day for Freedom"
 "Comfortably Numb"

LP 5:
 "On the Turning Away" (Venice, 12 August 2006)
 "The Blue" (Live from Abbey Road, August 2006)
 "Echoes" (Acoustic) (Live from Abbey Road, August 2006)
 "Barn Jam 166"
 "Barn Jam 121"

 Plus a 20-page booklet and a web-pass that allows a single download (mp3) version of one of the tracks from Disc 5 of the Deluxe Edition.

iTunes edition 

"Speak to Me"
"Breathe"
"Time"
"Breathe (Reprise)"
"Castellorizon"
"On an Island"
"The Blue"
"Red Sky at Night"
"This Heaven"
"Then I Close My Eyes"
"Smile"
"Take a Breath"
"A Pocketful of Stones"
"Where We Start"

"Shine On You Crazy Diamond"
"Astronomy Domine"
"Fat Old Sun"
"High Hopes"
"Echoes"
"Wish You Were Here"
"A Great Day For Freedom"
"Comfortably Numb"
"Wot's... Uh the Deal?" (except US and Canada)

and the following:
"Wearing the Inside Out" video (from the Mermaid Theatre)
"Take a Breath" video (from Live from Abbey Road)
"Speak to Me/Breathe/Time/Breathe (reprise)" [10:41] video (from Gdańsk) (US and Canada only)
"Shine On You Crazy Diamond" [5:12] partial video (first verse onwards) (from Gdańsk) (US and Canada only)
Digital booklet

Promotion 
UK Television
Gilmour guested on Jools Holland's live TV show Later! Live.... with Jools Holland on BBC2 on 23 September 2008, originally to promote the new live album, performing the songs "Astronomy Domine", "The Blue" and "Fat Old Sun" but with the death of Richard Wright on 15 September he changed his set to "Remember a Day" (one of Rick Wright's contributions to the A Saucerful of Secrets album) and "The Blue" (a track from On an Island to which Wright contributed organ and vocals).

On Friday 26 September 2008, BBC Four held a David Gilmour Night, showing part of the Gdańsk concert and "Gdańsk Diary" documentary.

US Television
VH1 Classic ran parts of the Gdańsk concert on several nights in late October. The programme includes songs omitted from the DVD: "Speak to Me" / "Breathe", "Time", "Shine On You Crazy Diamond", and "Wish You Were Here".

US Cinemas
Selected US cinemas gave showings of the "Gdańsk" concert during release week. This showing also included songs omitted from the DVD: "Speak to Me" / "Breathe", "Time", "Shine On You Crazy Diamond", and "Wish You Were Here", though the theaters' did not show "Echoes".

US Radio
Westwood One aired a world première of the "Gdańsk" concert the weekend before release and included new interviews with David Gilmour.

DavidGilmour.com
Since the announcement of the sets release, Gilmour has had certain songs up on his site that vary, including "Fat Old Sun" and "Wot's... Uh the Deal?" in low quality.

Personnel 
Tour personnel

Musicians
 David Gilmour – guitars, lead and backing vocals, console steel guitar, acoustic lap steel guitar, alto saxophone on "Red Sky at Night"
 Richard Wright – piano, Hammond organ, Farfisa organ, lead and backing vocals
 Jon Carin – keyboards, synthesiser, backing vocals, lap steel guitar, programming
 Guy Pratt – bass guitars, backing vocals, double bass, guitar on "Then I Close My Eyes", glass harmonica on "Shine On You Crazy Diamond"
 Phil Manzanera – guitars, backing vocals, glass harmonica on "Shine On You Crazy Diamond"
 Dick Parry – tenor and baritone saxophones, electronic organ, glass harmonica on "Shine On You Crazy Diamond"
 Steve DiStanislao – drums, percussion, backing vocals
 Zbigniew Preisner – conductor
 Leszek Możdżer – piano
 Polish Baltic Philharmonic orchestra – "Castellorizon", "On an Island", "The Blue", "Red Sky at Night", "This Heaven", "Then I Close My Eyes", "Smile", "Take a Breath", "A Pocketful of Stones", "Where We Start", "High Hopes*", "A Great Day for Freedom*" and "Comfortably Numb*" (Orchestrations by Zbigniew Preisner except "Comfortably Numb" by Michael Kamen.)
 Igor Sklyarov – glass harmonica on "Shine On You Crazy Diamond" (Venice performance only)
 David Crosby and Graham Nash - vocals on "Find the Cost of Freedom"

Other
 Polly Samson – tour photographer
 Anna Wloch – tour photographer
 Steve Knee – package design and artwork
 Andy Jackson, Devin Workman, Damon Iddins – audio mix
 Peter Robson "FEd" – davidgilmour.com
 Marc Brickman – visual design
 David McIlwaine – wire-man sculpture
 Piotr Skonieczny – backstage pass and artist's pass designs and poster design (found in Deluxe Edition)

Barn Jam personnel
 David Gilmour – guitar, console steel guitar, drums on "192"
 Richard Wright – keyboards
 Guy Pratt – bass, guitar on "192"
 Steve DiStanislao – drums, double bass on "192"

Charts

Weekly charts

Year-end charts

Certifications

Release schedule 
The release dates for the album are as follows:

 Europe, Brazil, Israel, New Zealand - 22 September 2008
 North America, Argentina, Chile  - 23 September 2008
 Australia - 27 September 2008
 Japan - 8 October 2008

References

External links 
Live In Gdańsk at davidgilmour.com

David Gilmour live albums
David Gilmour video albums
Albums produced by David Gilmour
Albums produced by Phil Manzanera
2008 live albums
2008 video albums
Live video albums
EMI Records live albums
Columbia Records live albums
EMI Records video albums
Columbia Records video albums